TW1 or variation, may refer to:

 TW1 post code of the UK in the TW postcode area
 TW1 (Austria), a TV channel
 The Witcher 1, 2007 video game, first in a series
 Tianwen-1 (TW-1), a 2020 Mars space probe from China
 PKP class Tw1, a steam locomotive design
 China Railways TW1, a steam locomotive in China; see List of locomotives in China
 Engineering Division TW-1, a 2-seat trainer biplane
 Training Air Wing One (TW-1), a U.S. Navy training air wing

See also

 The One Winner (T1W), an eSports team
 
 
 TWL (disambiguation)
 TWI (disambiguation)
 TW (disambiguation)